Combs Addition Historic District is a national historic district located at Gary, Indiana.  The district encompasses 99 contributing buildings in an exclusively residential section of Gary. They were built between 1928 and 1959 and are examples of the American Small House cottage movement with Colonial Revival and Tudor Revival design elements.

It was listed in the National Register of Historic Places in 2014.

References

Historic districts on the National Register of Historic Places in Indiana
Houses on the National Register of Historic Places in Indiana
Colonial Revival architecture in Indiana
Tudor Revival architecture in Indiana
Historic districts in Gary, Indiana
National Register of Historic Places in Gary, Indiana